Kalavi may refer to:
 Kalavi, Hormozgan
 Kalavi, Kermanshah
 Kalavi, Razavi Khorasan